Daniel Caffé (21 July 1750 – 16 January 1815) was a German pastel painter of portraits.

Caffé was born in Küstrin, and began his career as a painter of architectural decoration. He traveled to Dresden, where he became a portrait artist. In this way gained access into the Dresden Academy of Fine Arts under Casanova.  He was influenced by the neoclassical work of Mengs. After ten years in Dresden, he moved to Leipzig. He was favored by requests from Russian patrons, including Prince Beloselski and Admiral Fyodor Grigoryevich Orloff. He was also known for copying works from Dresden Gallery.

He died in Leipzig, aged 64.

See also
 List of German painters

References

1750 births
1815 deaths
18th-century German painters
18th-century German male artists
German male painters
19th-century German painters
German portrait painters
Pastel artists
19th-century German male artists